Frank Renzulli (born February 21, 1958) is an American film actor, writer, and producer.

As an Emmy nominated writer and Golden Globe winner, Renzulli has written teleplays for The Sopranos, mainly in the first two seasons, and another Emmy nominated episode in the third season of the television show. He co-executive produced the short-lived 2006 television show Heist on NBC. He was a co-executive producer and writer for the Starz drama series Crash. Crash showrunner Glen Mazzara handpicked the writing staff for the series and selected people with a background of writing edgier material; Renzulli topped his list. In 2010, he played Sal LoNano, the real-life manager of "Irish" Micky Ward, in the Golden Globe- and Academy Award-nominated film The Fighter. Frank Renzulli had a recurring role as the private detective Vinnie Delgato on NBC's Harry's Law. He reunited with Glen Mazzara to write a freelance episode of AMC's The Walking Dead entitled "When the Dead Come Knocking" in 2012. The episode was critically acclaimed and considered one of the best of the ongoing series.

Partial filmography

Broadway Danny Rose (1984) as Joe Rispoli
The Last Dragon (1985) as Hood #3
The Hidden (1987) as Michael Buckley
The Real Ghostbusters (1987-1990, TV Series) as Foul Grungie / Ghosts / Kids / Shifter / Calahan (voice)
A Different World (1988, TV Series) as Enrico
L.A. Law (1989, TV Series) as Dr. Romanelli
Warlock (1989) as Cabbie
Maverick Square (1990, TV Movie, writer)
Wild Hearts Can't Be Broken (1991) as Mr. Slater
Pros and Cons (1991, TV Series) as Frank the Coroner
The Wonder Years (1992)
The Adventures of Brisco County, Jr. (1993, TV Series) as Mr. Crocker
My Father the Hero (1994) as Fred
Where on Earth Is Carmen Sandiego? (1994, TV Series) (voice)
Confessions of a Hitman (1994) as Vinnie
Duckman (1994–1995, TV Series) as Roulette
The Great Defender (1995, TV Series, writer)
Charlie Grace (1995-1996, TV Series, writer)
The Practice (1997, TV Series) as Kenny Tripp (also writer 1998–2004)
That's Life (1998, TV Series, writer)
The Sopranos (1999–2001, TV Series, writer)
The Cactus Kid (2000)
Russo (2000, writer)
Hack (2002–2003, TV Series, writer)
10-8: Officers on Duty (2003-2004, TV Series, writer)
Crossing Jordan (2005, TV Series) as Frank Lioso
Heist (2006, TV Series, writer)
Crash (2008, TV Series) as Mr. Famisham (uncredited) (also writer 2008–2009)
The Fighter (2010) as Sal Lanano
Harry's Law (2011, TV Series) as Vinnie Delgato
The Walking Dead (2012, TV Series, writer)
Ray Donovan (2014) as Mike Renzetti
Scorpion (2016, TV Series) as Patrick Grady
Damien (2016, TV Series) as Lieutenant Murnau
The Poison Rose (2019) as Richard Gregory

References

External links
 

People from East Boston, Boston
American male film actors
American male screenwriters
Living people
21st-century American male actors
Male actors from Boston
Writers from Boston
American television writers
American male television actors
20th-century American male actors
Television producers from Massachusetts
American male television writers
1958 births
Screenwriters from Massachusetts